"Please" is a song by Irish rock band U2. It is the eleventh track on their ninth album, Pop (1997), and was released as its fourth single on 22 September 1997. As with "Sunday Bloody Sunday", the song is about The Troubles in Northern Ireland. The single cover for this song features pictures of four Northern Irish politicians – Gerry Adams, David Trimble, Ian Paisley, and John Hume (clockwise from top left). Two months before the release of the single, live versions of "Please" and three other songs from the PopMart Tour were released on the Please: PopHeart Live EP in September 1997.

Live performances
This song was played live during every performance of the PopMart Tour, with an outro similar to the drumbeat to that of "Sunday Bloody Sunday."  Each performance segued directly into "Where the Streets Have No Name."  During the Elevation Tour, the song was initially played in electric form before being played acoustically by Bono and the Edge at about 20 different shows.  The song has not been played in full since the final show of the Elevation Tour. However, it was frequently sampled along with "The Hands That Built America" during "Bullet the Blue Sky" on the Vertigo Tour. It was later sampled in the outro of "I'll Go Crazy If I Don't Go Crazy Tonight" on the U2 360° Tour to lead into the beginning of fellow Northern Ireland Troubles song "Sunday Bloody Sunday".

Critical reception
British magazine Music Week rated the song four out of five. An editor, Alan Jones, wrote, "U2's "Please" has attracted more attention for its sleeve — depicting Northern Ireland's political leaders in Warholian style — than it has for its musical merit, which is a shame, since it's vintage U2, eschewing the dance beat which they have pursued of late in favor of a more traditional style. It's helped on its way by some fine guitar licks, and some nicely judged percussion work." David Fricke from Rolling Stone noted Bono's "arcing anguish" on the track.

Formats and track listings

Note
The four live tracks were previously released in other countries on the Please: PopHeart Live EP.

B-sides

The "Please" singles were backed with the following B-sides:

"Dirty Day"
Two remixes of "Dirty Day" from Zooropa were made for the single, both by Butch Vig and Duke Erikson of the alternative rock group Garbage.

"I'm Not Your Baby" (Skysplitter Dub)
This song was recorded for the soundtrack for Wim Wenders' The End of Violence, in collaboration with Sinéad O'Connor. The version featured here is an instrumental remix, with few differences from the original version.

"Please" and "Where the Streets Have No Name" (Live from Rotterdam)
This performance was taken from the European première of the PopMart Tour on 18 July 1997 at Feijenoord Stadium, in Rotterdam, Netherlands. The middle eight in "Please" featured the drumbeat from "Sunday Bloody Sunday", and the outro, with Bono's falsetto, segued into the opening chords of "Where the Streets Have No Name", which was updated to an almost techno sound. The end of the performance included some lyrics from another song from Pop, "The Playboy Mansion".

"With or Without You" (Live from Edmonton)
This performance of "With or Without You" was taken from the first leg of the PopMart Tour in June 1997, at Commonwealth Stadium in Edmonton, Canada.

"Staring at the Sun" (Live from Rotterdam)
This performance of "Staring at the Sun", played by Bono and the Edge as part of an acoustic set at the PopMart concerts, was a departure from the version on the Pop album. It was a more subtle, vocal-oriented version, with only the two guitars and some harmonies during the choruses.

Alternative versions
There are five versions of this song available:
The album version, featured on Pop.
The single version, on the single and video. This version was more similar to the live performances, with an orchestrated intro and the "Sunday Bloody Sunday" drumbeat on the middle eight. This version was recorded at the Wisseloord Studios in Hilversum, Netherlands.
The USA edit, a special edit included on the US versions of the "Please" single CD. It is a more stripped down and shortened version of the single version. Its running time is 3 minutes, 55 seconds.
The live performance from the 18 July 1997 concert in Rotterdam, also from the single.
Another live performance, from the 3 December 1997 concert in Mexico City. This version appears on the Hasta la Vista Baby! album.

Music videos
The accompanying music video for "Please" is a black-and-white concept piece by Anton Corbijn. It takes place on a street called "No Name" (a reference to the song "Where the Streets Have No Name") where a beggar is standing, with a sign saying "please" hanging from his neck. Several people pass by on their knees, until a point where this situation is reversed. The band actually does not show up for much of the video, finally making an appearance during the Edge's guitar solo.  This video appears on the DVD for The Best of 1990-2000, along with the director's commentary.

Two live videos from the PopMart Tour have been released as well – one video from the PopMart: Live from Mexico City release, and one known as the "Mural Mix", (filmed in Helsinki on 9 August 1997), which was released on "The History Mix" bonus disc from The Best of 1990-2000 & B-Sides.

Charts

Weekly charts

Year-end charts

Release history

References

1997 singles
U2 songs
Island Records singles
Songs written by Bono
Songs written by the Edge
Songs written by Adam Clayton
Songs written by Larry Mullen Jr.
Song recordings produced by Flood (producer)
Songs about The Troubles (Northern Ireland)
Music videos directed by Anton Corbijn
1997 songs